Diego Garay (born 1 February 1975 in Argentina) is an Argentinean retired footballer.

References

Argentine footballers
1975 births
Living people
Association football midfielders
Newell's Old Boys footballers
Sportivo Belgrano footballers
RC Strasbourg Alsace players